Goldenhurst Farm (now Goldenhurst Manor and The Old House, Goldenhurst)  is a country house of 17th century origins in the village of Aldington, Kent. From 1926 to 1956, it was the country home of Noël Coward.  It is a Grade II listed building.

Coward 1926–56
Coward found the property after placing an advert in the Kentish Times and receiving only one reply.  Initially renting the farm from a Mr Body, Coward bought it in 1927.  In extensive rebuilding and renovation in 1927–9, he linked together "the farmhouse, the square edifice, one of the barns and an adjoining cottage" to create a substantial country house.

He wrote Cavalcade at Goldenhurst in 1931.  During the Second World War the house was requisitioned by the Army and Coward moved temporarily to White Cliffs, a house he rented at St Margaret's Bay.  He finally returned to Goldenhurst in December 1951, recording in his diary; "We arrived at 1.55 - the house and land seemed to envelop me in a warm and lovely welcome.  We spent the day hanging more pictures etc.  Utterly exhausted but deeply and profoundly happy.  I am home again."  But the post-war tax regime made the expense of running the large house increasingly burdensome, Coward writing to Laurence Olivier in 1957; "Goldenhurst (five gardeners all year round, lighting, heat etc.) was costing a fortune."   He therefore sold the house, and his London home in Gerald Road, in 1956 and moved abroad for tax reasons, dividing his time between Les Avants in Switzerland and, firstly Bermuda, and then Firefly, his home in Jamaica.

Description
The house is timber-framed, of brick and Kentish ragstone, with a tiled roof and is now sub-divided into two separate properties.

Between 2006 and 2018, part of the house was home to the comedian and novelist Julian Clary. The gardens of Goldenhurst were featured in the 2017 book The Secret Gardeners by Victoria Summerley and photographer Hugo Rittson Thomas.

Notes

References

References

 
 
 
 

Farmhouses in England
Houses in Kent
Grade II listed buildings in Kent
Grade II listed houses
Noël Coward